Andrés García de Bustamante Caballero (born May 27, 1959), better known by his stage name Andrés Bustamante, is a Mexican comedian and actor. He worked at TV Azteca (previously State-owned Imevision). His work includes children's show Los Cuentos del Espejo, and multi-character sketch format shows Entre Amigos, Sin Tornillos and El Güiri Güiri. He has authored two books: ¿Y yo por que? ('Why me?') and ¿Por que yo no? ('Why not me?'). Fritz Glockner compared him with Tin Tan.

Notes

References
Biografía Andrés Bustamante
Andrés Bustamante: alquimista del humor

Mexican male comedians
1959 births
Living people
20th-century Mexican male actors
21st-century Mexican male actors
Mexican male film actors
Mexican male voice actors
Mexican male television actors
People from Mexico City
Male actors from Mexico City
Comedians from Mexico City